The Atlantic sailfish (Istiophorus albicans) is a species of marine fish in the family Istiophoridae of the order Istiophoriformes. The Atlantic sailfish is related to the marlin.

Atlantic sailfish hunt schooling fish, such as sardines, anchovies and mackerel although they also feed on crustaceans and cephalopods.

Description

The Atlantic sailfish is a metallic blue fish with a large sail-like dorsal fin and a long and pointed bill-like snout. It is dark bluish-black on the upperparts and lighter on the sides (counter-shading), with about twenty bluish horizontal bars along the flanks; the underparts are silvery white. The tail fin is strongly forked. The fins are bluish-black and the front dorsal fin is speckled with small black spots. The bases of the anal fins are pale.

In previous studies, sailfish hunting schools of sardines rely heavily upon stealth and quick slashing or tapping with the rostrum in order to temporarily immobilize prey and facilitate capture in small prey. The adaptive advantage of the bill is highly debated and many different functions have been suggested. The bill has been hypothesized to increase the hydrodynamic qualities of the fish and even to ward off predators. However, it has been well documented that the sailfish utilizes the bill in hunting.

Distribution and habitat
The Atlantic sailfish is a pelagic fish of tropical and temperate waters in the Atlantic Ocean. It ranges from approximately 40°N in the northwestern Atlantic to 40°S in the southwestern Atlantic, and 50°N in the northeastern Atlantic to 32°S in the southeastern Atlantic. It is a migratory species and moves about the open ocean and into the Mediterranean Sea.

Taxonomy
Some authorities only recognise a single species of sailfish, Istiophorus platypterus, with I. albicans being treated as a synonym for I. platyperus.

References

External links
Video clips from the BBC

Atlantic sailfish
Fish of the Atlantic Ocean
Fish of the Dominican Republic
Sport fish
Atlantic sailfish

de:Atlantischer Fächerfisch